is a Japanese voice actress and narrator from Tokyo, Japan. She is well known for voicing Nefertari Vivi in One Piece.

Filmography

Television Animation
1990s
Magical Princess Minky Momo (1991) – Mother
Baby and Me (1996) – Yukako Enoki
Master Keaton (1998) – Anna
2000s
Detective Conan (2000) - Yumiko Niikura
Ghost Stories (2000) – Momoko's Mother
Saiyuki (2000) – Kanzeon Bosatsu
Geneshaft – (2001) Ann
One Piece – (2001) Nefertari Vivi
X/1999 – Tokiko Magami
Naruto – (2002) Tsunami, Tsukiko Kagetsu
Ashita no Nadja (2003) – Marie
Absolute Boy (2005) – Hana Tokimiya
Basilisk (2005) – Akeginu
Demashita! Powerpuff Girls Z (2006) – Kiyoko Gotokuji
Air Gear (2006) – Kyo 
Ergo Proxy (2006) – Swan
Hataraki Man (2006) – Midoriko Shirakawa
Dinosaur King (2007) – Ursula
Higurashi no Naku Koro ni (2007) – Rina Mamiya
Fresh Pretty Cure! (2009) – Northa
2010s
Sailor Moon Crystal (2014) – Queen Beryl
World Trigger (2015) – Nozomi Kako
2020s
Higurashi no Naku Koro Ni Sotsu (2021) - Rina Mamiya
Unknown date 
Fair, then Partly Piggy – Announcer Yadama (the "Weather Lady")
Otogi-Jushi Akazukin – Cendrillon
Tales Of Symphonia: The United World – Martel
Viewtiful Joe – Diana

OVA
Interlude (2004) – Miyako Saegusa
Mobile Suit Gundam Unicorn (2010) – Liam Borrinea

Film Animation
Episode of Alabasta: The Desert Princess and the Pirates (2007) – Nefertari Vivi

Video Games
Grandia II (2000) – Selene
Ico (2001) – Queen
From TV Animation - One Piece: Grand Battle! 2 (2002) – Vivi
Everybody's Golf (2003) – Marion
Tales of Symphonia (2003) – Martel
Ace Combat 5: The Unsung War (2004) – Nastasya Vasilievna Obertas
Ace Combat Zero: The Belkan War (2006) – Marcera Vasquez
Metal Gear Solid 3: Snake Eater (2004) – EVA
Metal Gear Solid: Portable Ops (2006) – EVA
Warriors: Legends of Troy (2011) – Penthesilea
JoJo's Bizarre Adventure: All Star Battle (2013) – Gold Experience Requiem
JoJo's Bizarre Adventure: Eyes of Heaven (2016) – Gold Experience Requiem
Super Robot Wars OG: The Moon Dwellers (2016) – XN-L
Persona 5 Strikers (2020) -- EMMA

Tokusatsu
Mahou Sentai Magiranger (2005) - Vancuria

Dubbing roles

Live-action
Cameron Diaz
Feeling Minnesota (Freddie Clayton)
Charlie's Angels (2003 TV Asahi edition) (Natalie Cook)
Vanilla Sky (Julianna "Julie" Gianni)
Charlie's Angels: Full Throttle (2006 TV Asahi edition) (Natalie Cook)
Gambit (PJ Puznowski)
A Liar's Autobiography: The Untrue Story of Monty Python's Graham Chapman (Sigmund Freud)
Téa Leoni
Deep Impact (Jenny Lerner)
Jurassic Park III (Amanda Kirby)
Hollywood Ending (Ellie)
Spanglish (Deborah Clasky)
Cynthia Nixon
Sex and the City (Miranda Hobbes)
Sex and the City: The Movie (Miranda Hobbes)
Sex and the City 2 (Miranda Hobbes)
And Just Like That... (Miranda Hobbes)
21 Grams (Mary Rivers (Charlotte Gainsbourg))
24 (Nina Myers (Sarah Clarke))
About Schmidt (Jeannie Schmidt (Hope Davis))
Apollo 13 (2003 Fuji TV edition) (Mary (Tracy Reiner))
Ballistic: Ecks vs. Sever (Rayne Ecks / Vinn Gant (Talisa Soto))
Bill & Ted's Bogus Journey (1994 TV Tokyo edition) (Elizabeth (Annette Azcuy))
Billy Madison (Veronica Vaughn (Bridgette Wilson))
Blade II (Nyssa Damaskinos (Leonor Varela))
Casper: A Spirited Beginning (Sheila Fistergraff (Lori Loughlin))
The Cat in the Hat (Joan Walden (Kelly Preston))
Charlie and the Chocolate Factory (2008 NTV edition) (Mrs. Bucket (Helena Bonham Carter))
CSI: NY (Jo Danville (Sela Ward))
Cube Zero (Cassandra Rains (Stephanie Moore))
Demon Knight (Cordelia (Brenda Bakke))
Desperate Housewives (Bree Van de Kamp (Marcia Cross))
Duck, You Sucker! (Adelita (Maria Monti))
Dumb and Dumber (J.P. Shay (Karen Duffy))
Dying of the Light (Michelle Zuberain (Irène Jacob))
ER (Maggie Doyle (Jorja Fox))
Fantastic Four (2008 NTV edition) (Alicia Masters (Kerry Washington))
Fever Pitch (Robin (KaDee Strickland))
Frank Herbert's Dune (Lady Jessica (Saskia Reeves))
Frank Herbert's Children of Dune (Lady Jessica (Alice Krige))
Gentleman Jack (Anne Lister (Suranne Jones))
The Godfather (2001 DVD edition) (Connie Corleone (Talia Shire))
The Godfather Part II (2001 DVD edition) (Connie Corleone (Talia Shire))
Heat (Charlene Shiherlis (Ashley Judd))
Hulk (Betty Ross (Jennifer Connelly))
Independence Day (Jasmine Dubrow (Vivica A. Fox))
Independence Day: Resurgence (Jasmine Dubrow (Vivica A. Fox))
The Interpreter (Silvia Broome (Nicole Kidman))
Jumanji (2000 TV Asahi edition) (Nora Shepherd)
The Man (Lt. Rita Carbone (Susie Essman))
Midnight in Paris (Adriana (Marion Cotillard))
Mission: Impossible (2003 TV Asahi edition) (Claire Phelps (Emmanuelle Béart))
Monkeybone (Dr. Julie McElroy (Bridget Fonda))
Mr. Wonderful (Leonora DeMarco (Annabella Sciorra))
My Lovely Sam Soon (Kim Yi-young (Lee Ah-hyun))
New Fist of Fury (Ah Lung's Mother)
The Pacifier (Julie Plummer (Faith Ford))
Parental Guidance (Alice Decker-Simmons (Marisa Tomei))
Proof of Life (Alice Bowman (Meg Ryan))
The Rock (2000 TV Asahi edition) (Carla Pestalozzi (Vanessa Marcil))
Silent Hill (Rose Da Silva (Radha Mitchell))
Sin (Bella (Alicia Coppola))
Sky Captain and the World of Tomorrow (Polly Perkins (Gwyneth Paltrow))
Someone like You (Liz (Marisa Tomei))
Spy (Rayna Boyanov (Rose Byrne))
Starship Troopers (Dizzy Flores (Dina Meyer))
Table 19 (Bina Kepp (Lisa Kudrow))
Ticker (Claire Manning (Jaime Pressly))
The Truman Show (Sylvia / Lauren Garland (Natascha McElhone))
Twin Peaks: Fire Walk with Me (Shelly Johnson (Mädchen Amick))
Vertical Limit (Monique Aubertine (Izabella Scorupco))
Vigil (Amy Silva (Suranne Jones))
What Lies Beneath (Mary Feur (Miranda Otto))
Zoey's Extraordinary Playlist (Joan (Lauren Graham))

Animation
Aladdin (Sadira)
Batman: The Animated Series (Veronica Vreeland)
Batman & Mr. Freeze: SubZero (Veronica Vreeland)
The Incredibles (Mirage)
Monsters, Inc. (Flint)

References

External links

1964 births
Living people
Aoni Production voice actors
Japanese video game actresses
Japanese voice actresses
Voice actresses from Tokyo
21st-century Japanese actresses
20th-century Japanese actresses
Production Baobab voice actors